Football was contested for men only at the 1954 Central American and Caribbean Games in Mexico City, Mexico.

The gold medal was won by El Salvador who earned 7 points.

Participating teams

Medal winners

Table 

A 2 point system used.

Results

Statistics

Goalscorers

References

External links

Central American and Caribbean Games 1954 (Mexico)
Match Details

1954 Central American and Caribbean Games
1954